The 1983 Women's World Team Squash Championships were held in Perth, Australia and took place from October 31 until November 4, 1983.

Results

Pool A

Pool B

Semi-finals

Positional Play Offs

Final

References

See also 
World Team Squash Championships
World Squash Federation
World Open (squash)

World Squash Championships
Squash tournaments in Australia
International sports competitions hosted by Australia
Squash
Wom
1983 in women's squash
Sport in Perth, Western Australia